Tha Ton, also spelled Thaton, is a sub-district (tambon) of Mae Ai District in the far north of Chiang Mai Province, Thailand. In 2014 it had a population of 19,902. The sub-district is on the Kok River near the border with Myanmar, about a three hour drive north of Chiang Mai. The central village of the subdistrict is Ban Tha Ton.

History

The river forms part of the border and consequently the village has changed hands numerous times in the turbulent history of the area with the latest change happening in the early-20th century when the border was moved 3.2 km upstream leaving the north bank, previously part of Burma (Myanmar), to Thailand. This part of Tha Ton, known in Thai as Ban Rom Thai, is inhabited by the Shan ethnic group. The area around Tha Ton is populated by various hill tribes including Yao, Lisu, Lahu, Karen, and Akha. Tha Ton is also home to Chinese nationalists forced to flee from their home-in-exile after the coup in Burma.

Administration

Central administration
The tambon is divided into 15 administrative villages (mubans).

Local administration
The sub-district is governed by the sub-district administrative organization (SAO) Tha Ton (องค์การบริหารส่วนตำบลท่าตอน)

Tourism
Tha Ton is on the widely travelled tourist route between Chiang Mai and Chiang Rai. Since the 1970s, riverboat trips between Chiang Rai and Tha Ton have given foreign tourists as well as native Thais the opportunity to visit jungle, observe different ethnic groups, and see the Fang Plain, bringing an influx of capital into the local economy. In the 1980s, this trend continued with the building of several small resorts to accommodate tourists.

Wat Tha Ton
The village is overlooked by a hilltop Buddhist temple known as Wat Tha Ton. The temple complex includes four huge statues of the Buddha, two in typical Thai-style and two showing Chinese influence. One of these, the standing Buddha, is over 10 m tall. Overall, there are nine stations which include statues or shrines. The eighth station houses the monastery and various shrines. The ninth station is a 2 km walk along a paved footpath with elevation gain.

References

External links

 History and pictures of Wat Tha Ton temple
 Tha Ton at Thaitambon.com (Thai)

Tambon of Chiang Mai province
Populated places in Chiang Mai province